La Pitoune was a log flume ride at the Montreal's La Ronde amusement park. Its final year of operation was during the 2016 season.

History
La Pitoune opened the same year as La Ronde, in 1967, and operated for 50 seasons. In May 2017, on what would have been its 50th anniversary, Six Flags announced the ride had reached the end of its useful life and would not reopen. During its final season in 2016, it was one of the original rides of La Ronde still operating. Only 5 original rides remain, with 3 still in operation: Tchou Tchou, Joyeux Moussaillons, La Marche du Mille Pattes (previously Petites Montagnes Russes), Le Galopant, La Spirale.

Six Flags has not yet announced what will replace the ride. In 2018, most of La Pitoune was dismantled.

Ride experience
After a first 180 degrees turn, riders entered a conveyor belt. At the end, riders followed the flume, which brought them back to almost ground level during a series of gentle falls and turns, and after another conveyor belt, riders ended their ride with the last chute. The ride was themed around the chasse-galerie, a popular French-Canadian tale.

Notes

References

External links
Official webpage

La Ronde (amusement park)
Expo 67